Christian Graf von Forbach may refer to:
Christian of the Palatinate-Zweibrücken (1752–1817)
Christian of the Palatinate-Zweibrücken (1782–1859)